Agnippe syrictis is a moth of the family Gelechiidae. It is found in Russia (Novosibirsk Region), eastern Kazakhstan, Mongolia, China (Ningxia, Henan, Tianjin), Korea and Japan.

The wingspan is 8–9 mm. The costal part of the forewings is black and the posterior part is yellow-cream. The costal margin has small yellow-white spots. The hindwings are light grey. Adults are on wing from July to August, probably in two or three generations per year.

The larvae feed on Pinus species, and possibly also on Larix sibirica, Prunus armeniaca and Prunus persica.

References

Moths described in 1936
Agnippe
Moths of Asia